Bayt Baws is a historic village and fortress in Bani Matar District of Sanaa Governorate, Yemen. It is a largely deserted Jewish settlement. It is located to the south of Sanaa, in a strategic position on the western side of the Sanaa plain. It served as a locally important stronghold throughout the middle ages and was especially used as a staging point for campaigns against Sanaa. Its period of greatest significance was during the campaigns of Al-Hadi ila'l-Haqq Yahya, the first Imam of Yemen. According to tradition, Bayt Baws is named after a person named Dhū Baws, whose genealogy is given either as Dhū Baws b. ‘Abd al-Rahmān b. Zayd b. ‘Abd Il b. Sharḥabīl b. Marāthid b. Dhī Saḥar or as Dhū Baws b. Barīl b. Sharaḥbīl, of the tribe of Himyar.

References 

Villages in Sanaa Governorate